Jesus and the rich young man (also called Jesus and the rich ruler) is an episode in the life of Jesus recounted  in the Gospel of Matthew , the Gospel of Mark  and the Gospel of Luke  in the New Testament. It deals with eternal life and the world to come.

Narratives
In Matthew and Mark, the discussion is set within the period when Jesus ministered in Perea, east of the River Jordan. In Matthew, a rich young man asks Jesus what actions bring eternal life. First, Jesus advises the man to obey the commandments. When the man responds that he already observes them, and asks what else he can do, Jesus adds:

Luke has a similar episode and states that:

The non-canonical Gospel of the Nazarenes is mostly identical to the Gospel of Matthew, but one of the differences is an elaboration of this account. It reads:

Interpretation
This event relates the term "eternal life" to entry into the Kingdom of God. The account starts with a question to Jesus about eternal life, and Jesus then refers to entry into the Kingdom of God in the same context. The rich young man was the context in which Pope John Paul II brought out the Christian moral law in chapter 1 of his 1993 encyclical letter Veritatis splendor.

While Jesus's instructions to the rich young ruler are often interpreted to be supererogatory for Christians, Dietrich Bonhoeffer argues that this interpretation acquiesces in what he calls "cheap grace", lowering the standard of Christian teaching:

In the other references, it says:

Justus Knecht reflects on this passage, writing: "The young man had kept the commandments from his youth up; and yet he did not feel satisfied. He wished to do even more than was commanded, or was absolutely necessary; in other words, he wished to reach a higher state of perfection. Our Lord, seeing this, gave him this counsel: 'If thou wishest to be perfect, become voluntarily poor, and follow Me.' There is no desire more noble, or more pleasing to God than the desire for perfection; and as our Lord looked at the young man, He loved him for this yearning of his soul." Knecht goes to say that unfortunately the young man "resisted our Lord’s gracious invitation, because of his too great attachment to the things of this world."

See also
 Christian views on poverty and wealth
 Christian socialism
 Epistle of James, 5:1–6
 Evangelical counsels
 Eye of a needle
 Gospel harmony
 Jesuism
 Simple living
 With God, all things are possible

References

Gospel episodes